Palaemonetes pugio (daggerblade grass shrimp) is a small, transparent shrimp with yellow coloring and brownish spots. It can be found in estuarine and tidal marsh habitats throughout the western Atlantic Ocean and  Gulf of Mexico. Palaemonetes pugio has a smooth carapace and abdomen, as well as three pairs of legs. The second pair is the strongest, while the third pair lacks chelae (claws). Like most grass shrimp, it is a forager and feeds on a variety of items, including microalgae. They themselves are consumed by killifish and other small foraging fish.

References

Further reading

External links 
Daggerblade Grass Shrimp

Palaemonidae
Crustaceans of the Atlantic Ocean
Crustaceans described in 1949
Taxa named by Lipke Holthuis